Ett annat liv (lit. A Different Life) is a 2008 novel by Swedish author Per Olov Enquist. It won the August Prize in 2008.

References

2008 Swedish novels
Swedish-language novels
August Prize-winning works